Three-time defending champion Novak Djokovic defeated Roger Federer in the final, 6–3, 6–4 to win the singles tennis title at the 2015 ATP Finals. It was his fifth Tour Finals title. With the win, Djokovic became the first player to win the event four consecutive times.

Seeds

Alternates

Draw

Finals

Group Stan Smith
Standings are determined by: 1. number of wins; 2. number of matches; 3. in two-players-ties, head-to-head records; 4. in three-players-ties, percentage of sets won, then percentage of games won, then head-to-head records; 5. ATP rankings.

Group Ilie Năstase
Standings are determined by: 1. number of wins; 2. number of matches; 3. in two-players-ties, head-to-head records; 4. in three-players-ties, percentage of sets won, then percentage of games won, then head-to-head records; 5. ATP rankings.

References

External Links
Main Draw

Singles